Shutter Bugged Cat is a 1967 Tom and Jerry cartoon, produced in the Chuck Jones era. The story was supervised by Tom Ray. As with the previous cartoon Matinee Mouse, William Hanna and Joseph Barbera received a special director's credit, though the two did not contribute any work towards the cartoon (other than the footage from classic cartoons produced in their era) and Tom and Jerry were animated using their original designs.

Plot
The cartoon starts with Tom watching clips of himself attempting to catch Jerry, the first of which is from "Part Time Pal" where Tom chases Jerry until he is hit in a wall and Jerry then proceeds to eat a corn as Tom drags it and gives chase. Jerry escapes by knocking down all milk bottles, and Tom later pauses the clip. The next clip is from "Nit-Witty Kitty" in the scene where Tom is eating cheese on a seesaw and Jerry throws a bowling ball on the seesaw and Tom is hit in the head by the ceiling until the ball hits him and Tom pauses this. The clip after that is from "Johann Mouse" where Tom slides into the stairs to get Jerry, but he is hit in the window and falls, Tom rewinds this in slow-motion reverse and checks the heights and measurements of the disaster. Jerry comes out of his hole and sees "The Yankee Doodle Mouse" clips, he smiles and drags out a bag of popcorn and brings out a telescope to watch the clips. The final clip is from "Heavenly Puss", in the part when Tom tries to catch Jerry before Tom was hit by a piano. Tom rewinds the clip to where he just begins pulling up the carpet, and he replays the scene a second time. When Jerry starts laughing, Tom turns from making his calculations and spots the laughing mouse. He chases Jerry, but hits his head on a wall.

Tom nails Jerry's mouse hole shut, and decides to make a mouse trap to catch Jerry (using footage from the 1955 short Designs on Jerry). Jerry gets out of his mouse hole and finds the trap. He modifies a measurement on the blueprints in order again to make the trap fail (like he did in Designs on Jerry). The trap is set, but the safe contraption (a part of the trap meant to get him) hits Tom instead. Later, Jerry films a flattened and bandaged Tom ripping the blueprints he used for the mouse trap.

External links

1967 films
1967 short films
1967 animated films
Films directed by Tom Ray
Short films directed by Joseph Barbera
Short films directed by William Hanna
Tom and Jerry short films
1960s American animated films
Animated films without speech
1967 comedy films
Compilation films
Films scored by Dean Elliott
American comedy short films
Metro-Goldwyn-Mayer short films
Metro-Goldwyn-Mayer animated short films
MGM Animation/Visual Arts short films
1960s English-language films